Uļi Kīnkamäg (real name Uldriķis Kāpbergs; March 25 1869, born in  Miķeļtornis – June 01 1932, died in Ventspils) was Livonian nationalist and religious zealot. He was known for not accepting Latvian rule over Livonians and for this he got the nickname "King of Livs". He also wrote poetry to the magazine Līvli. In the 1920s, the Latvian police arrested him because he refused to pay his taxes. He died in Ventspils prison in 1932, and was buried in Miķeļtornis.

References

Livones.lv – Uļi Kīnkamegs
The Liv Coast (PDF)

1869 births
1932 deaths
People from Ventspils Municipality
People from Courland Governorate
Livonian people
Prisoners who died in Latvian detention